Brampton is a hamlet and civil parish in the West Lindsey district of Lincolnshire, England.

References

External links

Villages in Lincolnshire
Civil parishes in Lincolnshire
West Lindsey District